Magne or Magné is a French language surname.  Its origin is ambiguous, either derived from the Scandinavian language given name Magnus (meaning "great"), or a locational surname from "Magné" in Deux-Sèvres and Vienne. 

Magne is found in the compound name of the Frankish ruler Charlemagne, "Carolus Magnus" in Latin, "Charles the Great" in English.

People with the surname include:
 Antonin Magne (1904–1983), French cyclist
 Frédéric Magné (born 1969), French track cyclist
 Olivier Magne (born 1973), French rugby union footballer
 Xavier Magne, French Navy officer

See also
 Magne (given name)
 Magne (disambiguation)

References

French-language surnames